Chester Travis (born 4 July 1987) is a New Zealand film maker, author and musician. His most notable works include his music video for Kimbra's "Goldmine".

"Goldmine" was filmed in a factory in Berlin. It was shot in black-and-white using a high amount of stop-motion animation; and was co-directed by Timothy Armstrong.

The music video has received critical acclaim. Rolling Stone called the video "stunning"; while Paley Martin of Billboard proclaimed it as "an artful and edgy [...] piece set to a soul-piercing soundtrack". Scott Heins of Okayplayer described the video as "hypnotic".

In 2015, his ten part web series, "How To Be Gay" won Best Queer Series at San Francisco Web Festival.

Travis is also a musician, going by the stage name Great Danes. In 2016, Great Danes released their first EP and toured with Scottish rock band, Travis.

In 2017, Travis composed three songs for the Amazon Series You Are Wanted.

In June 2017, Travis received the APRA Best Country Music Song for Toothache at the  2017 New Zealand Music Awards.

Music Videos
 "Like They Do On The TV" - Kimbra (2018)
 "Everybody Knows Rework" - Kimbra/Apothek (2017)
 "Where The Down Bit Starts" - Great Danes/Kimbra (2016)
 "Goldmine" - Kimbra (2015)
 "Alive" - Pause Applause (2014)
 "The Gold Route" - Unmap (2014)
 "Einundzwanzig" - Jan Roth (2014)

Books
 My Summer Snowman, (2013) Curved House

References

External links
 
Chester Travis at chestertravis.com

1987 births
Living people
New Zealand filmmakers
New Zealand musicians
New Zealand country singers
New Zealand country guitarists
New Zealand alternative country musicians